Apple Music: Up Next is a monthly program published by Apple Music aimed at identifying, showcasing and elevating rising star talent. Each month, Apple Music's editorial team selects an artist to promote in order to raise global awareness of the artist and further to grow the artist's audience. In August 2017, Apple Music premiered a monthly mini-documentary series chronicling the artists' journey, inspiration and influences. Each season of the Apple Music-exclusive ends with interviews and live performances called Up Next Sessions. Each selected artist will receive a performance slot on either The Late Late Show with James Corden, or Jimmy Kimmel Live!, in addition to an Apple Music-exclusive extended play of their Up Next live performances. Artists who have previously been given the title are Billie Eilish, Khalid, Jessie Reyez, Bad Bunny, Sigrid, Clairo, and Daniel Caesar.

The platform also succeeds and is closely related to iTunes New Artist Spotlight which was active during the mid 2010s. Apple Music introduced an equivalent of the program for Sub-Saharan Africa titled "New Artist Spotlight" in 2019.

Artists

2010s

2020s 

ref>

References

ITunes
American non-fiction web series
2017 American television series debuts
Awards established in 2017
American music awards
The Late Late Show with James Corden
2017 web series debuts